Note: This special working group has been disbanded.

ISO/IEC JTC 1/SWG on Accessibility (SWG-A) was a special working group of the Joint Technical Committee ISO/IEC JTC 1 of the International Organization for Standardization (ISO) and the International Electrotechnical Commission (IEC) that promoted and facilitated standards development within the field of information and communications technology (ICT) accessibility. ISO/IEC JTC 1/SWG-A was formed at the October 2004 ISO/IEC JTC 1 Plenary Meeting in Berlin, Germany via approval of Resolution 24. 

After completing its goals by publishing ISO/IEC TR 29138 Parts 1, 2 and 3, it was dissolved. Maintenance of the standards was transferred to ISO/IEC JTC 1/SC 35.

The special working group was created as a response to the standardization demands regionally, locally, and globally, in the field of ICT for accessibility. The international secretariat of ISO/IEC JTC 1/SWG-A is administered by ITI/INCITS acting on behalf of the American National Standards Institute (ANSI), located in the United States. The first meeting of the special working group took place in Sheffield, United Kingdom in April 2005, where the group’s terms of reference were confirmed and its original two task groups established.

Terms of reference
The terms of reference for ISO/IEC JTC 1/SWG-A are:
 Determine an approach to, and implement, the gathering of accessibility‐related information, being mindful of the varied and unique opportunities including direct participation of user organizations, workshops, and liaisons
 Maintain and disseminate up‐to‐date information of all known accessibility‐related standards efforts, i.e. the standards inventory
 Maintain and disseminate up‐to‐date information on accessibility‐related user needs, i.e. the user needs summary
 Through wide dissemination of the SWG materials, encourage the use of globally relevant voluntary accessibility‐related standards
 Together with PAS mentors, advise consortia/fora, if requested, in their submission of accessibility‐related standards/specifications to the formal standards process
 Provide support when JTC 1 needs assistance related to accessibility (such as duties for WSC Accessibility Strategic Advisory Group and input on accessible ISO web content)

Structure
ISO/IEC JTC 1/SWG-A is made up of four active Ad Hoc groups, each of which carries out specific tasks within the field of accessibility. The four active Ad Hoc groups of ISO/IEC JTC 1/SWG-A are:

Collaborations
ISO/IEC JTC 1/SWG-A works in close collaboration with a number of other organizations or subcommittees, both internal and external to ISO or IEC. Organizations internal to ISO or IEC that collaborate with or are in liaison to ISO/IEC JTC 1/SWG-A include:
 ISO/IEC JTC 1/SC 7, Software and systems engineering 
 ISO/IEC JTC 1/SC 29, Coding of audio, picture, multimedia and hypermedia information 
 ISO/IEC JTC 1/SC 35, User interfaces
 ISO/IEC JTC 1/SC 36, Information technology for learning, education and training 
 ISO/TC 159, Ergonomics
 IEC TC 100, Audio, video and multimedia systems and equipment

Organizations external to ISO or IEC that collaborate with or are in liaison to ISO/IEC JTC 1/SWG-A include:
 ITU-T SG 16, Multimedia
 ITU-T FG AVA, Audiovisual Media Accessibility
 The Linux Foundation
 W3C Web Accessibility Initiative (WAI)

There are also a number of consumer organizations, user representatives, and other interested parties that are involved with ISO/IEC JTC 1/SWG-A, such as:
 American Foundation for the Blind (AFB) Tech
 Altarum Institute/Accessibility Forum
 ANEC
 Japanese Society for Rehabilitation of Persons with Disabilities (via the Japanese National Body)
 Japanese Industrial Standards (JIS) Committee on Web Accessibility
 Royal National Institute of the Blind (via the UK National Body)
 United States Access Board
 United States Department of Education
 University of Wisconsin (Trace R&D Center)
 Visual Impairment Knowledge Center
 WGBH National Centre for Accessible Media

Member countries

The members of ISO/IEC JTC 1/SWG-A are: Australia, Canada, Denmark, France, Germany, Italy, Japan, The Netherlands, Norway, The Republic of Korea, United Kingdom, and United States of America.

Publications
ISO/IEC JTC 1/SWG-A has a number of publications in the field of ICT accessibility, including:

Dissolution 
In a resolution adopted at the 29th meeting of ISO/IEC JTC 1 in November 2014, ISO/IEC JTC 1/SWG-A was disbanded. This special working group completed the tasks for which it was originally established with the publication of ISO/IEC TR 29138 Parts 1, 2 and 3. Part 2 of this document has been transitioned from a technical report to ISO/IEC JTC 1 publication, The Inventory of Accessibility and Accessibility-related Standards and Specifications, which is available on the ISO Online Browsing Platform (OBP). With the dissolution of ISO/IEC JTC 1/SWG-A, JTC 1 has transferred responsibility for the maintenance of The Inventory of Accessibility and Accessibility-related Standards and Specifications to ISO/IEC JTC 1/SC 35. All relevant ISO/IEC JTC 1/SWG-A documents were submitted to the ISO/IEC JTC 1 Secretariat for archiving and all liaisons and members were informed of the dissolution.

See also
 ISO/IEC JTC 1
 International Committee for Information Technology Standards
 Information Technology Industry Council
 American National Standards Institute
 International Organization for Standardization
 International Electrotechnical Commission
 List of ISO standards

References

External links 
 ISO/IEC JTC 1/SWG-A page at JTC 1
 INCITS home page

A
Web accessibility